LM-5, LM.5 or LM5 may refer to:

Light Miniature Aircraft LM-5,  American ultralight aircraft design
Lombardi LM.5, an Italian light aircraft design
LM5 (album), a 2018 album by Little Mix
Long March 5, Chinese heavy lift launch system
LM-5 Eagle, the Apollo 11 Lunar Module, named Eagle, the first to land humans on the Moon
Vektor LM5, assault rifle